Culduie is a small hamlet, located on the southwest corner on Applecross peninsula, which is south  of Applecross Village (Shore Street) in Strathcarron, Ross-shire  Scottish Highlands and is in the Scottish council area of Highland.

Culduie looks over the bay of Pola-creadh towards the hamlet of Ard-dubh.  Fishing was one of the main sources of income for Applecross residents and the bay still has a few active fishing boats mainly for prawn fishing these days. The hamlet is the place where the events described in His Bloody Project by Graeme Macrae Burnet take place.

References

Populated places in Ross and Cromarty